Myall Lakes National Park is a national park located in New South Wales, Australia,  north of Sydney. It encompasses one of the state's largest coastal lake systems Myall Lakes, and includes Broughton Island. The park includes 40 kilometres of beaches and rolling sand dunes. Myall Lakes is also one of the most visited parks in New South Wales.

History
The Worimi Aboriginal people had inhabited the Myall Lakes National Park land area for its abundance of natural resources. These natural resources had offered a traditional hunter-gatherer lifestyle for the Worimi people. The park includes important spiritual sites that are an important part of the identity of local Aboriginal people. Dark Point Aboriginal Place served as a location for the Worimi people to gather together for ceremonies and feasts and has been of significance to Worimi people for at least 4000 years.

Environment
Myall Lakes National Park incorporates a patchwork of freshwater lakes, the ocean, islands, native flora, dense littoral rainforest and beaches.

Since 1999, Myall Lakes has been listed under the Ramsar Convention.

Fauna
The lakes support a large variety of birds including bowerbirds, white-bellied sea eagle and tawny frogmouths.

Other native Fauna which can be seen in the park includes the nocturnal long-nosed bandicoot which has grey-brown fur and a pointed snout for which it uses to forage for worms and insects. The Striped marsh frog can be found near ponds and swamps and has a distinct sound which can be heard all year round.   The Eastern swamp crayfish was first discovered here.

Climate
The average high temperature during the summer season averages between 19 °C and 27 °C. The highest temperature recorded at the park is 41.5 °C. The average temperature during the winter season averages between 10 °C and 19 °C with the lowest temperature on record being 1.1 °C. The wettest month typically occurs in May while the driest month occurs in November. The area's highest recorded rainfall in one day is 257.8mm.

Gallery

Notes and references

See also
 Protected areas of New South Wales
 

National parks of the Hunter Region
Protected areas established in 1972
Mid-Coast Council
1972 establishments in Australia